Balming Tiger is a South Korean musical collective founded in 2018 in Seoul. The group consists of director San Yawn, rapper Omega Sapien, DJ Abyss, music video directors Jan'Qui and Leesuho, singer-songwriters Sogumm, Wnjn, and Mudd the Student, and editor Henson. In 2018, they released their first single "I'm Sick".

Balming Tiger describe themselves as a “multi-national alternative K-pop group” and refuse to be limited or defined by one specific genre.

Discography

Singles

Awards and nominations

References

External links 

 Balming Tiger YouTube
 Balming Tiger Instagram
 Balming Tiger Twitter

South Korean musical groups